The Warp of Pure Fun is an album by Paul Haig.

After the release of Paul Haig's first album with Island, Rhythm of Life (1983), tracks were recorded for a follow-up during 1984, including. The Only Truth, produced by Bernard Sumner and Donald Johnson of A Certain Ratio. However, due to lack of sales for Rhythm, Island got cold feet and decided to shelve the unreleased album entirely.

Rather than release the cancelled set on Crepuscule, it was decided to combine half the album with new songs recorded throughout 1985. Haig launched his fightback later in the year with a powerful single, "Heaven Help You Now", the lead single from The Warp Of Pure Fun.

Produced with Alan Rankine, it was a more involving, honest set than its predecessor, offering warmer songs and arrangements (and live drums) in place of programmed rhythm tracks, though without entirely abandoning club appeal. In the UK, The Warp Of Pure Fun appeared on another short-lived Crepuscule offshoot, Operation Afterglow, but while the album fared well as an independent release, Afterglow failed to propel it into the national chart.

Previously released on CD in Japan only, The Warp Of Pure Fun was fully remastered and re-released with bonus tracks by LTM in 2003, and again as part of a 4 CD box set in 2021.

Track Listing - 1986 Release
 Silent Motion
 Heaven Help You Now
 Love Eternal
 This Dying Flame
 Sense of Fun
 Scare Me
 Big Blue World
 The Only Truth
 One Lifetime Away
 Love and War

Track Listing - 2003 Release 
 Silent Motion
 Heaven Help You Now
 Love Eternal
 This Dying Flame
 Sense of Fun
 Scare Me
 Big Blue World
 The Only Truth
 One Lifetime Away
 Love and War
 Ghost Rider 
 Endless Song
 Shining Hour
 Trust
 Dangerous Life
 Closer Now
 World Raw

Paul Haig albums
1986 albums
Albums produced by Alan Rankine